is a Japanese voice actress and narrator who was formerly part of Arts Vision. She is currently affiliated with Crazy Box.

Notable voice roles

Anime
Banner of the Stars as Atosryac Ssynec Atosr Lymh Faibdacr Loïc
Black Heaven as Layla Yuki
Blue Drop: Tenshitachi no Gikyoku as Yuko Sugawara
Comic Party as Minami Makimura
Dear Boys as Keiko Ōgami
Dragon Ball: Goku's Fire Brigade as Fire Safety Kids Girl
Futari Ecchi as Mika Yabuki
Gakuen Alice as Serina Yamada
Godannar as Ecaterina
The Good Witch of the West as Sister Naomi
Horizon in the Middle of Nowhere as Yoshiki Aoi
Horizon in the Middle of Nowhere II as Yoshiki Aoi, Robert Dudley
Iketeru Futari as Yuki Umemiya
Inuyasha as Tsubaki (young form)
Invincible King Tri-Zenon as Sora Munakata
Izumo: Takeki Tsurugi no Senki as Nogiri
Karakurizōshi Ayatsuri Sakon as Kaoruko Tachibana
Kirby: Right Back at Ya! as Lalala
Love Get Chu as Junko Wakatsuki
Magic Users Club as Miki Mizusawa
Mobile Suit Gundam Seed Destiny as Sara
Ouran High School Host Club as Chizuru Maihara
Peach Girl as Morika
Pet Shop of Horrors as Q-chan
Pokémon as Shijima's wife (ep 209)
Saki series as Takako Kubo
Spiral: The Bonds of Reasoning as Takako Adachi
Trinity Blood as Mary Spencer
Witch Hunter Robin as Keiko Muramatsu
Yukikaze as Edith Foss

Game
Karin Kanzuki in Street Fighter Zero 3, Capcom Fighting Jam, Namco × Capcom
Constable Neyla in Sly 2: Band of Thieves
Crowdia in Rhapsody: A Musical Adventure
Minami Makimura in Comic Party
Yayoi Orikura in First Kiss Story
Maeka Kudanshita in Tokimeki Memorial 2
Norma Kissleigh in Rogue Galaxy
Salvatore in Disgaea 3: Absence of Justice

Drama CDs
 Fujiko Amacha in 7 Seeds

Tokusatsu
 Princess Multiwa in Chōriki Sentai Ohranger
 Merudameruda in Seijuu Sentai Gingaman
 Grand Witch Grandene in Kyuukyuu Sentai GoGoFive/Kyuukyuu Sentai GoGoFive vs Gingaman

Dubbing
Black Dawn as Agent Amanda Stuart (Tamara Davies)
The Bucket List as Angelica (Rowena King)
Mr. & Mrs. Smith (2008 NTV edition) as Jane Smith (Angelina Jolie)
Jennifer's Body as Jennifer Check (Megan Fox)
Lakeview Terrace as Lisa Mattson (Kerry Washington)
The Namesake as Moushumi Majumdar (Zuleikha Robinson)
No Way Out as Susan Atwell (Sean Young)
Saturday Night Fever as Annette (Donna Pescow)
Scream 3 as Sarah Darling (Jenny McCarthy)

References

External links
Miho Yamada at Ryu's Seiyuu Infos

1973 births
Living people
Voice actresses from Yokohama
Japanese voice actresses
Japanese video game actresses
20th-century Japanese actresses
21st-century Japanese actresses
Arts Vision voice actors